Mahindananda Aluthgamage (Sinhala:මහින්දානන්ද අලුත්ගමගේ) (born 21 November 1964) is a Sri Lankan politician and a former Minister of Sports. He has also served as Deputy Minister of Power and Energy. He is currently serving as the state minister of Power and Energy. 

He is a current Member of Parliament representing the Kandy Electoral District. He was educated at Gangasiripura Vidyalaya Gampola and Royal College Colombo. He lost his position as a minister in 2015 when former President Mahinda Rajapaksha was defeated at the election. He is well known for his ability to speak Sinhala, Tamil and English fluently and gained popularity among Tamil community for his political rallies in Northern Province.

Career 
He entered the mainstream politics in 1990 at the age of 25. He served as a people's representative in the Sri Lankan Parliament in 2000, 2001, 2004, 2010 and 2020. He served as the minister of sports from 2010 to 2015.

He was sworn in as the state minister of Power and Energy on 27 November 2019. In February 2020, his position was later changed and modified as state minister of Renewable Energy and Power. In June 2020, he was appointed as the spokesperson for the Sri Lankan government. In June 2020, he completed his 30 years of politics.

Controversies 
In 2018, he was accused of mishandling the funds during his tenure as sports minister from 2010 to 2015 and was arrested regarding the funds spent on imported cricket and other sports equipments.

Fixing allegations 
On 18 June 2020, in an interview with News First he made a shocking allegation that during his tenure as sports minister the 2011 World Cup final featuring India and Sri Lanka was fixed and further claimed that the 2011 World Cup trophy was sold to India without specifying any evidence. He didn't reveal the details of the cricketers and insisted that he will not disclose the details for the sake of the country with absolute responsibility. His comments drew widespread criticism and global media attention among the cricket fraternity. Former Sri Lankan cricketers Mahela Jayawardene and Kumar Sangakkara who were part of the World Cup final denied the allegations and claimed that the minister was seeking for publicity stunt and political advantage ahead of the upcoming parliamentary election. The Ministry of Sports also launched an investigation to probe the allegations made by Mahindananda.

Ex Sri Lanka cricket team captain Arjuna Ranatunga also made a serious allegation that the 2011 Cricket World Cup Final match between India and Sri Lanka had been fixed. Both Aluthgamage and Ranatunga demanded a probe into the events at the final match. The International Cricket Council stated that it will investigate him based on his match-fixing allegations under ICC anti-corruption unit. On 25 June 2020, however he claimed that his allegations were only suspicion and demanded for an independent investigation regarding the fixing claims. Although Sri Lankan Police conducted a probe, they later dropped it citing lack of sufficient evidence. Later International Cricket Council rubbished the match fixing claims made by Ranatunga and Aluthgamage.

References

External links
Biographies of Member of Parliament
Right Royal rally of old Royalists in the Sri Lanka Parliament

1964 births
Living people
Provincial councillors of Sri Lanka
Sports ministers of Sri Lanka
United People's Freedom Alliance politicians
Alumni of Royal College, Colombo
Members of the 11th Parliament of Sri Lanka
Members of the 12th Parliament of Sri Lanka
Members of the 13th Parliament of Sri Lanka
Members of the 14th Parliament of Sri Lanka
Members of the 15th Parliament of Sri Lanka
Members of the 16th Parliament of Sri Lanka
Sri Lanka Podujana Peramuna politicians
Politicians from Kandy
Sinhalese politicians
2011 Cricket World Cup